L. W. Higgins High School is a high school in Marrero, a community in unincorporated Jefferson Parish, Louisiana, United States. It is a part of the Jefferson Parish Public School System.

The school serves several communities. Its service area includes all of Avondale, Bridge City, Waggaman, and Westwego. Its service area includes portions of Marrero, and Estelle.

Athletics
L. W. Higgins High athletics competes in the LHSAA.

Football
Coaches
Wayne Meyers compiled a 112–76 record in 18 seasons as Higgins coach during which time the Hurricanes won five district championships and advanced to the state playoffs 11 times during his final 14 seasons. Wayne Meyers directed the Hurricanes to 11 winning seasons that included two advances to the state quarterfinals in 2008 and 2003 and seven regional playoff appearances. The Hurricanes only had four losing seasons under Meyers with those coming in his first and final two seasons. On November 7, 2013, Wayne Meyers resigned as L. W. Higgins head football coach at the request of Principal David Lewis.

Boys' Basketball
Coaches
For the 2017-18 season Elden Irving was hired as the new head boys basketball coach. Irving attended Redeemer High School (New Orleans) and received numerous local, state, and national awards. In 1984, Irving was named Mr. Basketball by the Louisiana Association of Basketball Coaches. In January 2009, Irving was recognized as one of the area's top basketball athletes of all time by the Clarion Herald newspaper. Irving attended Tulane University and later transferred to University of New Orleans where he finished his collegiate career. After finishing college, Irving went on to play with numerous tour teams overseas.

Extracurricular activities
Higgins also has band, pep squad, flag team and diamond dancers dance team.

Notable alumni
 Melvin Frazier, NBA Orlando Magic 
 Skyler Green, former NFL player
 Nate Singleton, former NFL player
 Jason Williams, basketball player for Hapoel Be'er Sheva of the National Basketball League of Israel

References

External links

 
 L. W. Higgins High School (Archive)

Public high schools in Louisiana
Schools in Jefferson Parish, Louisiana